Martinelli was a music project of Italian record producer Aldo Martinelli (producer of such italo-disco bands as Scotch and Raggio Di Luna/Moon Ray) and American singer Simona Zanini.

They had their biggest hit with the song "Cenerentola" (1985), which was a hit across Europe, reaching number 8 in West Germany, number 5 in Austria, number 6 in Switzerland and number 5 in France.

Discography

Singles 
 1983: "Voice (In the Night) (7") 1985: "Cenerentola (cinderella)" — number 8 in West Germany, number 5 in Austria, number 6 in Switzerland
 1986: "O. Express"
 1986: "Revolution" — number 18 in Switzerland
 1987: "O. Express"
 1987: "Summer Lovers"
 1987: "Victoria"

 EPs 
 2011. American Band''

See also 
 Raggio Di Luna (Moon Ray)
 Radiorama
 Topo & Roby

References

External links 
 
 

Italo disco groups
Italian pop music groups
Musical groups from Milan